"Fallin'" is a song by Greek musical duo Playmen featuring Greek singer Demy. It was released as a digital download in Greece on 11 January 2012 as the third single from her debut studio album #1 (2012). The song also peaked at number 1 on the Greek Singles Chart.

Music video
A music video to accompany the release of "Fallin'" was first released onto YouTube on 12 February 2012 at a total length of four minutes and twenty-three seconds.

Track listing

Charts

Release history

References

2012 songs
2012 singles